Dante Thomas (born January 7, 1982) is an American R&B singer and musician, who experienced international success in 2001 with his song, "Miss California".

Musical career
He was discovered by Donovan Thomas and Doug E. Fresh.

His debut album Fly contained his definitive international hit "Miss California" which topped the charts in Denmark and Germany and was a major hit in Austria, Belgium, France, Netherlands, Norway, Australia and New Zealand. It also reached number 25 in the United Kingdom and number 85 in the US on the Billboard Hot 100.

In 2012, he released his album Hardcore on Videotape and has an international single hit "Feeling So Blue" with Michael Mind Project, being a retake on Eiffel 65 1999 hit "Blue (Da Ba Dee)". The single "Feeling So Blue" has charted in Austria, France, Germany and Switzerland.

Discography

Albums

Singles

Other singles
 2002: "Cielo e Terra (Heaven and Earth)" (with Nek)
 2016: "Lonely" (with DJ Tomekk)

Featured in

References

External links
 Official website

1978 births
Living people
Musicians from Salt Lake City
21st-century American singers
21st-century American male singers